Pulsatilla vernalis (spring pasqueflower, arctic violet, lady of the snows) is a species of flowering plant in the family Ranunculaceae, native to mountainous habitats in Europe.

The specific epithet vernalis means "of spring".

In cultivation it is suitable for an alpine garden or alpine house, with sharply drained soil in full sun. Though very hardy it dislikes winter wetness. It has gained the Royal Horticultural Society's Award of Garden Merit.

It was the county flower of the former county Oppland, Norway and was depicted in the county coat of arms. It is also the county flower of Härjedalen, Sweden and South Karelia, Finland.

References

External links

vernalis
Flora of Europe
Plants described in 1753
Taxa named by Carl Linnaeus
Taxa named by Philip Miller